Stopklatka TV is a Polish television channel owned by Stopklatka SA. It offers film subject matter being involved in a company Kino Polska (Cinema Poland), of SPI International Polska belonging to the group and the Agora S.A. The channel started on March 15, 2014.

History
National Broadcasting Council granted concession to this station on 30 October 2013. Stopklatka began broadcasting on 15 march 2014, turning into the first free and public TV channel in Poland. The branding was refreshed on 14 April 2017.

See also

Television in Poland
Television in Poland#Terrestrial

External links

References

Television channels in Poland
Television channels and stations established in 2014